The Universidade São Francisco (USF) is a small university in Brazil, founded in 1976 by Franciscan priests.

It has campuses in four cities in the State of São Paulo: Bragança Paulista, Itatiba, Campinas, and São Paulo.

References

Universities and colleges in São Paulo (state)
Educational institutions established in 1976
1976 establishments in Brazil
Universities and colleges in São Paulo
Private universities and colleges in Brazil